Nanterre-Ville is a railway station in Nanterre on the A1 branch of the Paris RER commuter rail line. Trains come every 10 minutes and the area is about 12 minutes ride from La Defense business district and about 18 minutes from the Arc de Triomphe.

Railway stations in France opened in 1972
Réseau Express Régional stations in Hauts-de-Seine